is a North Korean international school in Higashi-ku, Hiroshima, Japan, serving elementary school through senior high school.

References

External links
 Hiroshima Korean School 

Education in Hiroshima Prefecture
Elementary schools in Japan
Buildings and structures in Hiroshima
High schools in Hiroshima Prefecture
North Korean schools in Japan